Arambai, also known as Alapai tenton (meaning arrowhead flew in distance), is a dart weapon used by the Meitei cavalry soldiers of Kangleipak while mounted on Manipur Ponies. The cavalry armies use arambai as attacking or retreating weapon, and it is usually poisoned.

Reference

Throwing weapons